"Love Is the Ritual" is the first single released from Edge of the Century by Styx.

Background
The song was written and sung by Glen Burtnik, who had been recruited by the band as a new guitarist. Shaw was at that time busy as a member of the group Damn Yankees.

Burtnik had recorded the track before he was offered a position with Styx in anticipation of using it for his third solo album. The track was re-recorded during recording sessions as Styx. Burtnik's original version was later released on his compilation album Retrospectable.

The song also appeared on the B-side of the 7" single release of "Carrie Ann"  (A&M Records – 390 610-7) which had been only released in Europe.

Charts
"Love Is the Ritual" was a disappointment commercially. It peaked at only #80 on the Billboard Top 100 Singles chart. However, it fared better on the Billboard Mainstream Rock Tracks chart, where it attained #9. It also reached #59 on the Canada RPM Top Singles chart the week of November 24, 1990.

Personnel
Glen Burtnik - lead vocals, lead guitar
Dennis DeYoung - keyboards, backing vocals
James Young - rhythm guitar, backing vocals
Chuck Panozzo - bass 
John Panozzo - drums

Track listing
7"
 "Love Is the Ritual"
 "Homewrecker"

12" picture disc
 "Love Is the Ritual"
 "Homewrecker"
 "Babe"

Notes

References
Styx - Love Is the Ritual

1990 singles
1990 songs
Styx (band) songs
Funk rock songs
Songs written by Glen Burtnik
A&M Records singles